Gene Bowen, also known as Eugene Bowen (born 1950), is a composer, guitarist, pedal steel guitarist, sound designer and vocalist.   He has collaborated with and appears on recordings by a number of new music composers, including Harold Budd and Daniel Lentz.

Bowen was working with Harold Budd, James Tenney, Daniel Lentz, Wolfgang Stoerchle and John Baldessari while studying at California Institute of the Arts in the 1970s, where he plays guitar, keyboards, synthesizers and sings. He has contributed to Harold Budd's recordings in one of the landmark albums of the ambient style, Ambient 2: The Plateaux of Mirror (EG, 1980 with Brian Eno), The Serpent (In Quicksilver) (Cantil, 1981), Abandoned Cities (Cantil, 1984), etc. Recently he collaborated with John Densmore – the drummer of The Doors – at Hen House Studios.

Recordings

Solo albums 
 Bourgeois Magnetic (Cantil/Amorfon) (produced by Harold Budd and Gene Bowen)
 Vermilion Sea (Caroline/Gyroscope)

Collaborations 
 Compilation (Cold Blue CB0008) ("Wonder's Edge" with Harold Budd) 
 Ambient 2: The Plateaux of Mirror (Virgin) (with Harold Budd and Brian Eno)
 Abandoned Cities (Opal Records 9 26025–2) (with Harold Budd)
 Hen House Studios Anthology #1 Hen House Studios) (with John Densmore)

External links
Gene Bowen Interview, May 2007

1950 births
Living people
20th-century classical composers
21st-century classical composers
Pedal steel guitarists
Male classical composers
20th-century American guitarists
21st-century American guitarists
American male guitarists
20th-century American composers
20th-century American male musicians
21st-century American male musicians